Jeremy Pemberton may refer to:
Jeremy Pemberton (priest), the first male Anglican priest to marry another man
Jeremy Pemberton (Chief Justice), former Chief Justice of Nova Scotia